Shintō Taikyō (神道大教), formerly called Shinto Honkyoku (神道本局), is a Japanese Shintoist organization, and was established by Meiji officials in 1873. It is recognized officially, and its headquarters are in Tokyo. It has many shrines, and Tenrikyo used to be under its jurisdiction.

It is one of the thirteen shinto sects.

Its name Taikyo refers to the Three Great Teachings first proclamed in the Proclamation of the Great Doctrine. and it is linked to the historical Great Teaching Institute

Three Great Teachings 
The organization follows these Three Great Teachings dating back to the Proclamation of the Great Doctrine

 respect for the gods, love of country;
 making clear the principles of Heaven and the Way of Man;
 reverence for the emperor and obedience to the will of the court.

References

See also
Izumo-taishakyo

Shinto new religious movements
Shinto in Tokyo
Daikyoin
13 Shinto Sects
Shinto denominations